Prado del Rey is a station on Line 2 of the Metro Ligero. It is located in fare Zone B1.

It serves nearby Radiotelevisión Española (RTVE) central headquarters and production center.

References 

Madrid Metro Ligero stations
Buildings and structures in Pozuelo de Alarcón
Railway stations in Spain opened in 2007